Undeb Cenedlaethol Athrawon Cymru (meaning 'National Union of Teachers of Wales'; commonly referred to as UCAC), is a trade union for teachers in Wales. Formed from a split from the National Union of Teachers in the late 1940s over the issue of the Welsh language in teaching. It has around 4,000 members, who are nearly all Welsh speakers, representing mainly teachers in Welsh medium schools or teachers of Welsh in English medium schools. It accounts for about 15% of the total teacher workforce in Wales.

It is affiliated to the UK Trades Union Congress (since 1994), since under current TUC rules it is not permissible to affiliate only to TUC Cymru.

Its main office is in Aberystwyth, Ceredigion.

As well as representing its members at all levels it also campaigns for an independent education system for Wales.

References

External links

Official website

Education in Wales
Education trade unions
Trade unions established in 1940
Trade unions in Wales
Organisations based in Aberystwyth
Trade unions affiliated with the Trades Union Congress